Givebacks is a trade union term for the reduction or elimination of previously won benefits.

History
1978: The first known publication of the term giveback in relation to organized labor negotiations was in The New York Times.

References

External links

 

Trade unions